Marcel Camiel "Bob" DeJaegher (December 2, 1923 – June 13, 2007) was an American politician.

Born in Moline, Illinois, DeJaegher served in the United States Navy during World War II. He was involved in the Democratic Party. From 1997 to 2005, DeJaegher served as town supervisor for the Hampton Township, Rock Island County, Illinois and on the Silvis, Illinois city council. He also served on the Rock Island County Board of Commissioners. From 1983 to 1995, DeJaegher served in the Illinois House of Representatives. He died at a hospital in Silvis, Illinois.

Notes

1923 births
2007 deaths
People from Moline, Illinois
Military personnel from Illinois
County commissioners in Illinois
Illinois city council members
Democratic Party members of the Illinois House of Representatives
20th-century American politicians
United States Navy personnel of World War II